North Jutland may refer to:

North Jutland Region, administrative region covering North Jutland and minor parts of central Jutland
North Jutland County, prior administrative region covering North Jutland
North Jutlandic Island, northernmost part of Denmark and of Jutland
Northern Jutland, a historical region in Denmark
Vendsyssel, the district that makes up most of North Jutland